Robert Sinclair Dietz (September 14, 1914 – May 19, 1995) was a scientist with the US Coast and Geodetic Survey. Dietz, born in Westfield, New Jersey, was a marine geologist, geophysicist and oceanographer who conducted pioneering research along with Harry Hammond Hess concerning seafloor spreading, published as early as 1960–1961. While at the Scripps Institution of Oceanography he observed the nature of the Emperor chain of seamounts that extended from the northwest end of the Hawaiian Island–Midway chain and speculated over lunch with Robert Fisher in 1953 that something must be carrying these old volcanic mountains northward like a conveyor belt.

Early life and education
Born and raised in Westfield, New Jersey, Dietz graduated in 1932 from Westfield High School.

Career
In later work he became interested in meteorite impacts, was the first to recognize the Sudbury Basin as an ancient impact event, and discovered a number of other impact craters.  He championed the use of shatter cones as evidence for ancient impact structures.  He received the Walter H. Bucher Medal from the American Geophysical Union in 1971,  the Barringer Medal from the Meteoritical Society in 1985 and the Penrose Medal from the Geological Society of America in 1988.

Dietz was an outspoken critic of creationism, and was the faculty advisor of two student groups at Arizona State University in 1985, Americans Promoting Evolution Science (APES) and the Phoenix Skeptics.  Dietz spoke on evolution and creationism at meetings of these groups, and debated creationist Walter Brown and Christian apologist William Lane Craig at Arizona State University.

Death
Dietz died in Tempe, Arizona.

Minor planet 4666 Dietz is named in his honor.

Robert S. Dietz lectures
The ASU School of Earth and Space Exploration sponsors annual Robert S. Dietz Memorial Public Lectures, which have been given by:
2006 National Center for Science Education Executive Director Eugenie Scott
2007 NASA Astronaut John M. Grumsfeld
2011 John Grotzinger, Caltech

Selected publications

References

Bibliography

External links
 Dietz and Hess
 Dietz Museum of Geology at ASU

Tectonicists
Arizona State University faculty
American oceanographers
20th-century American geologists
American geophysicists
Critics of creationism
Scripps Institution of Oceanography faculty
Penrose Medal winners
Barringer Medal winners
Geology of Hawaii
1914 births
1995 deaths
People from Westfield, New Jersey
Marine geologists
Westfield High School (New Jersey) alumni